Nazeer Allie (born 23 May 1985) is a South African soccer player who plays as a defender for Premier Soccer League club Cape Town Spurs and the South African national team.

External links

1985 births
Living people
Soccer players from Cape Town
South African people of Malay descent
South African soccer players
Cape Town Spurs F.C. players
Bidvest Wits F.C. players
Maritzburg United F.C. players
South African Premier Division players
Association football defenders
South Africa international soccer players